John Camden Pierson (born October 5, 1953) is an American professional baseball player and coach. He was the hitting coach for the Miami Marlins of Major League Baseball in 2013.

Pierson was selected by the Kansas City Royals in the first round of the 1973 secondary phase draft. He served as the Marlins' minor league hitting coordinator before being appointed to replace Tino Martinez on July 28, 2013, on an interim basis.

References

External links

Living people
1953 births
Gulf Coast Royals players
Waterloo Royals players
Miami Marlins coaches
Major League Baseball hitting coaches